Elliot Whitney was a group pseudonym used by various authors including:

 H. Bedford-Jones
 Harry Lincoln Sayler

References

Pseudonymous writers